Pat "PatMac" McAteer (17 March 1932 — 30 April 2009) born in Birkenhead was an English professional light middle/middle/light heavyweight boxer of the 1950s who won the British Boxing Board of Control (BBBofC) British middleweight title (between 16 June 1955 - 5 September 1957) and British Empire middleweight title (between 16 June 1955 - 27 March 1958 ) and was a challenger for the European Boxing Union (EBU) middleweight title against Charles Humez, his professional fighting weight varied from , i.e. light middleweight to , i.e. light heavyweight.

Genealogical information
Pat McAteer was the younger brother of Michael J. "Mick" McAteer (birth registered October→December  in Birkenhead district), and the boxer William R. "Billy" McAteer (birth registered July→September  in Birkenhead district), the cousin of the boxer Les McAteer, and the uncle of association (soccer) footballer Jason McAteer.

References

External links

Image - Pat McAteer
Video - Pat Mcateer New Middleweight Champion 1955
Birkenhead boxing legend Pat McAteer’s Lonsdale belt stolen in burglary
Merseyside Form Boxers Association → The Greats → Pat McAteer

1945 births
2009 deaths
English male boxers
Light-heavyweight boxers
Light-middleweight boxers
Middleweight boxers
Sportspeople from Birkenhead
Boxers from Liverpool